Taxation is an English-language weekly magazine for professional UK tax advisors. It is owned by LexisNexis, part of RELX. The magazine is edited in the LexisNexis Sutton office. The first issue was published on 1 October 1927 and it has been in continuous publication ever since. The masthead declares that the magazine has been 'since 1927 the leading authority on tax law, practice and administration'. It is published on Thursdays.

Contents
Each issue of Taxation usually contains about 25 pages of editorial, in addition to display and recruitment advertising and a directory of service providers. The editorial content is written by contributors and by a small in-house team with a background in the tax profession. Typical contents include:
Comment article – expressing the view of the contributor about a particular technical tax issue, typically calling for a change in the law or in HM Revenue & Customs practice.
Update – news of changes in tax and comment on them from industry spokespeople, plus concise coverage of recent tax cases.
Feature articles – normally three main articles, around 2000 – 3000 words each, examining a particular tax issue in technical detail. Occasionally there are interviews with leading figures in the tax industry.
Meeting points – concise reports of practical tax issues taken from presentations at conferences and seminars.
Feedback – correspondence from readers.
Readers' Forum – technical tax questions sent in by readers, which are then answered three issues later by other readers.

History
The magazine was founded by its first editor, Ronald Staples, and originally published by Gee & Company, and then by Taxation Publishing Company, formed in 1932. It was sold in 1984 to Tolley Publishing Co, which through a series of mergers became part of LexisNexis.

Staples, who was also a founding member of what became the Chartered Institute of Taxation continued as editor until 1957. Subsequent editors have been:

 Percy Hughes 1957 – 1977
 Ken Tingley  1978 – 1984
 Simon Owen  1984 – 1988
 Malcolm Gunn 1988 – 2004
 Mike Truman 2004 – 2015
 Richard Curtis 2015–present

Online
The magazine's website, www.taxation.co.uk, has an archive of articles going back to 2000. Most of the site is behind a subscription log-in, but some articles - most notably those in the Latest News section - are available to non-subscribers. Subscribers to the magazine can get a log-in to the website at no extra cost.

Weekly e-Newsletter

Each Wednesday an e-newsletter is sent to all registered readers – this is a mix of subscribers and those that have signed up to receive the newsletter, which is free of charge. The newsletter contains links straight into the most recent articles as well as listing the latest jobs that have been posted on www.taxation-jobs.co.uk and a calendar on upcoming events of interest to tax professionals.

Circulation
Circulation for the magazine, audited by the Audit Bureau of Circulations (ABC), was over 8,500. 
Each issue's official date range is from Thursday to the next Wednesday, and in the UK print copies are dispatched late Wednesday, for Friday delivery to customers. Retail outlets receive their copies on Thursday/Friday depending on their location. The Taxation website posts each week's new content on Wednesday morning, ahead of the official publication date.

External links
 Taxation magazine's website
 Chartered Institute of Taxation
 LexisNexis magazines
 Taxation conferences
 Taxation's site for jobseekers

Weekly magazines published in the United Kingdom
Business magazines published in the United Kingdom
Taxation in the United Kingdom
Magazines established in 1927
Magazines published in England